The action of 22 June 1803 was a naval battle between the United States Navy and the Tripolitan Navy during the First Barbary War. After fighting a sharp action for forty five minutes the gunboats veered off and the polacre was abandoned. The Tripolitians later retook the polacre and were reengaged by the Americans before the vessel was destroyed in a large explosion.

Aftermath
The destruction of the Tripolitan polacre was the greatest victory the American navy had yet inflicted over the Tripolitans. As such the confidence and morale of the American Mediterranean squadron ran so high that its commander saw no further need to blockade Tripoli and withdrew his vessels.

Citations

References

22 June 1803, Action of
Conflicts in 1803
1803 in Africa
Naval battles involving Ottoman Tripolitania
June 1803 events